Swart River originates near Caledon, Western Cape, South Africa, and flows southwest, where it joins the Bot River north of Hermanus.

See also 
 List of rivers of South Africa
 List of dams in South Africa
 List of drainage basins of South Africa
 Water Management Areas

References

Rivers of the Eastern Cape